The 1908–09 Army Cadets men's ice hockey season was the 6th season of play for the program.

Season
1909 saw the fewest games played in a single season in the history of Army's program.

Roster

Standings

Schedule and Results

|-
!colspan=12 style=";" | Regular Season

† Army records do not indicate which Trinity College they played.

References

Army Black Knights men's ice hockey seasons
Army
Army
Army
Army